U.S.C.H! (short for "Ultimate Synthetic Corrosion Helter-Skelter") is the third studio album by the Finnish industrial metal band Turmion Kätilöt. Released 11 June 2008 for free download on Turmion Kätilöt's record label Raha Records, it consists of 10 songs. The first single from the album, "Minä Määrään", was released for free download on Raha Records' website (now replaced with the free download of U.S.C.H!) on 21 May 2008. The band have announced a presale of the physical album, to be released on 13 May 2009.

A few songs from the album are known from their endings, which include secret messages, like Kuolleitten laulu's "I can't take this anymore!" which correctly played says "Minä en kestä enää!", the same as "I can't take this anymore!" in Finnish. Another song like this is Destination Hades - when played backwards it says: "I want to play a game. Search the alternative endings for your U.S.C.H., and the prize will be yours! Let the hunt begin!". This hints the listeners to listen the song endings backwards.

Track listing

References

2008 albums
Albums free for download by copyright owner
Turmion Kätilöt albums